The Second McDonald Ministry was the 58th ministry of the Government of Victoria, which consisted of members of the Country Party. It was led by the Premier of Victoria, John McDonald, and Deputy Premier Keith Dodgshun.

The ministry was formed when the Governor of Victoria, Sir Dallas Brooks, asked McDonald to form an interim government after dismissing the ministry of Thomas Hollway's electoral reform group which had been in government for just seventy hours, and calling an election. McDonald's government was also short-lived, lasting 47 days (31 October to 17 December 1952) until it was defeated at the state election in December by the Labor Party under John Cain.

Portfolios

References

McDonald Ministry 2
Ministries of Elizabeth II
1952 establishments in Australia
1952 disestablishments in Australia
Cabinets established in 1952
Cabinets disestablished in 1952